"Andar Conmigo" (English: Go out with me, Literally: Walk with me) is the first single from the Mexican singer Julieta Venegas third studio album Sí.
The song was nominated for Latin Grammy Award for Song of the Year.

Song information

This song was written and produced by Coti Sorokin and Julieta Venegas, who plays the accordion and drum machine with Coti on guitars, bass and vocals (background). It was released as a debut single from her album in 2003, occupying the 33rd place on Billboard and 14 on the Hot Latin Tracks and Latin Pop Airplay. It also took first place in Mexican radio ratings for 15 weeks. In 2008, Venegas made a new version of the song for her MTV Unplugged.

Live performance

In the 6° installment Latin Grammy Award for singing with the band norteña Los Tigres del Norte a popurrí of "El Taxista", "Andar Conmigo (Norteña Version)" and "La Manzanita".

Music video 

The music video was filmed in Buenos Aires under the direction of Santiago Pueyrredon. The video was paid for with Julieta's own money because the label did not want to give her money for the film. The "actors" were friends, relatives and acquaintances of Julieta.

The video depicts a bride in a canteen looking for a partner. She wears a torn dress and no makeup. She walks around the canteen seeing potential partners of all ages. In the end Julieta appears sporting a new dress and makeup, and gives the "yes" to a mature gentleman outside the bar and they kiss.

The video was nominated for "Video of the Year" in 2004 in the MTV VMAla's, but was ultimately won by Cafe Tacvba's "Eres".

Track listing

Digital download
 "Andar Conmigo" — 3:15

CD Single
 "Andar Conmigo" — 3:17

Charts

Weekly charts

References

2003 singles
Julieta Venegas songs
Songs written by Julieta Venegas
Songs written by Coti
RCA Records singles